Shihab al-Din Muhammad al-Nasawi (died c. 1250) was a Persian secretary and biographer of the Khwarazmshah Jalal ad-Din Mingburnu. Born in Nasa in Khorasan, he witnessed first-hand the Mongol invasion of Khorasan and Jalal ad-Din's subsequent flight and military adventures of which he left an account written in Arabic c. 1241. He had beforehand written another work, the Nafthat al-masdur, an account of his life prior to 1231, written in Persian c. 1234/5.

References

Sources 
 
  
 

1250 deaths
13th-century Iranian historians
Year of birth unknown
Officials of the Khwarazmian Empire